Baby of the Bride is a 1991 American drama television film directed by Bill Bixby. It was filmed in July 1991 and It premiered on CBS on December 22, 1991, and was released on DVD in 2003. It was preceded by Children of the Bride (1990) and followed by Mother of the Bride (1993).

Cast
 Rue McClanahan as Margret Becker-Hix
 Kristy McNichol as Mary
 John Wesley Shipp as Dennis
 Anne Bobby as Anne
 Conor O'Farrell as Andrew
 Ted Shackelford as John Hix
 Beverley Mitchell as Jersey
 Casey Wallace as Amy
 Sam T. Jensen as Baby Sam

Baby of the Bride (IMDB)

References

External links
 

1991 television films
1991 films
1991 drama films
1990s English-language films
Films directed by Bill Bixby
CBS network films
American pregnancy films
Television sequel films
1990s pregnancy films
American drama television films
1990s American films